Asclepias subverticillata is a plant found in the southwestern United States and Mexico. Common names include horsetail milkweed, poison milkweed and whorled milkweed.

Description

Distribution and habitat
It is indigenous to New Mexico, Arizona, Colorado and Utah and parts of some nearby states, in addition to Mexico.

Toxicity
The species is unpalatable and very toxic to livestock.

Uses
Among the Zuni people the buds are eaten by young boys. The pods are also gathered when two-thirds ripe and the fibers are used for weaving clothing. The coma is made into cords and used for fastening plumes to the prayer sticks.

References

subverticillata
Fiber plants
Flora of the United States
Plants used in Native American cuisine